Chemish Ridge (‘Hrebet Chemish’ \'hre-bet 'che-mish\) is the rocky ridge extending 8.55 km in west-northwest to east-southeast direction, 2 km wide and rising to 880 m on Foyn Coast, Antarctic Peninsula.  The ridge surmounts Attlee Glacier to the north and Bevin Glacier to the south, with its east extremity forming Fitzmaurice Point.

The feature is named after the settlement of Chemish in Northwestern Bulgaria.

Location
British mapping in 1974.

Maps
 British Antarctic Territory: Graham Land.  Scale 1:250000 topographic map.  BAS 250 Series, Sheet SQ 19–20.  London, 1974.
 Antarctic Digital Database (ADD). Scale 1:250000 topographic map of Antarctica. Scientific Committee on Antarctic Research (SCAR). Since 1993, regularly upgraded and updated.

Notes

References
 Chemish Ridge. SCAR Composite Antarctic Gazetteer.
 Bulgarian Antarctic Gazetteer. Antarctic Place-names Commission. (details in Bulgarian, basic data in English)

External links
 Chemish Ridge. Copernix satellite image

Ridges of Graham Land
Foyn Coast
Bulgaria and the Antarctic